Jimmy Djimrabaye (born April 8, 1992) is a Central African professional basketball player for Bangui Sporting Club. During his career, he has played in France for several teams in the LNB Pro A and LNB Pro B.

He also played in Africa, when in 2008, he played for Red Star Ndongo in the qualification games for the 2008 FIBA Africa Clubs Champions Cup. Fourteen years later, in 2022, Djimrabaye played with Bangui Sporting Club in the Road to BAL 2023.

National team career 
Djimrabaye represents Central African Republic in international competition. He competed for the national Under-18 team in the 2008 FIBA Africa Under-18 Championship. Djimrabaye competed with the senior team for his country at the AfroBasket tournaments of 2009, 2011, 2015, 2017 and 2021. Their best results were the 6th place in 2009 and 2011.

References

External links 
Jimmy Djimrabaye at Eurobasket.com
FIBA.com profile
Jimmy Djimrabaye at RealGM
French League profile

Bangui Sporting Club players

1992 births
Living people
BCM Gravelines players
Berck Basket Club players
Centers (basketball)
Central African Republic expatriate sportspeople in France
Central African Republic men's basketball players
Denain Voltaire Basket players
ESSM Le Portel players
Expatriate basketball people in France
JA Vichy players
Orléans Loiret Basket players
People from Bangui
Power forwards (basketball)